The 2009 Philippine Basketball Association (PBA) rookie draft was an event at which teams drafted players from the amateur ranks. The event was held at Market! Market! in Taguig on August 2, 2009. The Burger King Whoppers selected Japeth Aguilar of the Ateneo de Manila University and Western Kentucky University as the number one draft pick. Players applied for the draft had undergone a three-day rookie camp. 
This is the only draft wherein a draft pick held by a defunct franchise was not retained by a new team which purchased that franchise
(the second overall pick originally held by Shell was not inherited by Rain or Shine).

Japeth Aguilar controversy
As expected, the Burger King Whoppers nabbed Japeth Aguilar as its overall No.1 draft pick in the 2009 PBA draft; however days after the draft, he boldly declare that he would join the Smart Gilas Pilipinas developmental basketball program coached by Serbian Rajko Toroman, a move which caused controversy within the PBA and angst especially by the team that drafted him.  Its governor, Lito Alvarez, even went to the extent of banning Aguilar from the league for his refusal to sign with the Whoppers.

An amicable settlement was reached on October 9, 2009, two days before the 35th PBA season. With SBP prexy Manny Pangilinan and executive director Noli Eala intervening and at Alvarez's behest, Aguilar signed the one-year contract with the Whoppers, which included him playing for a few games with them then he would be traded to Talk N Text Tropang Texters (Pangilinan's PBA team) which would then release him to Smart Gilas as he wanted. Alvarez even said that before Aguilar signed their contract, the former already has had the latter's No.18 uniform with the Whoppers made.

Aguilar played his only professional game with the Whoppers against the Purefoods Tender Juicy Giants in the PBA season opener, which ended in a 93-80 loss to the Giants. Immediately after, Aguilar got his wish as the Whoppers traded him to the Tropang Texters in exchange for future draft picks, indirectly through Barako Bull Energy Boosters which acted as the conduit team.  As expected, TNT loaned him to Smart Gilas where he will stay there until after the 2012 London Olympics as per his Gilas contract.

As the consequence of this controversy, the board of governors approved stiffer penalties for rookie draftees who would turn their back on the league.

Round 1

Round 2

Undrafted players
Josh Urbiztondo – signed with Sta. Lucia Realty
Bryan Faundo from Letran – signed with Barako Bull Energy Boosters
Marlon Adolfo from Far Eastern
Charleston Bocias from Sta. Francis of Assisi
Kim Macanig - Philippine Christian University
Axel John Doruelo from UP Diliman – signed with Thailand Tigers in the ABL – signed with Petron Blaze Boosters
Jim Bruce Viray from San Sebastian – signed by the Barako Bull Energy Boosters as free agent
Luis Palaganas East
Leemore Boliver from Arellano / Philippine Christian University
Glenn Bolocon from Emilio Aguinaldo
Roel Hugnatan from Adamson
Richard Saladaga from San Jose -  Recoletos
Dino Daa from Letran – signed with Philippine Patriots in the ABL
Jonathan Pinera from Letran
Jorel Canizares from East
Gerry Orera from Adamson
Ramsey Williams from Hawaii – signed with Quezon Red Oilers in the Liga Pilipinas and picked up by Burger King as a free agent
Jerome Cenita from San Sebastian - Cavite
Jemal Vizcarra from Santo Tomas
Roser Mangahas from Far Eastern University
Jerby Del Rosario from Mapua
Floyd Dedicatoria from JRU
Jan Philip Villaver from San Sebastian - Cavite
Chris Viardo from Pilgrim High School
Howard Saddi from Centro Escolar University
Hafer Mondragon from Letran – signed with Philippine Patriots in the ABL
Raymond Aguilar from National
Cris Angelo Espinosa from JRU
Allan Evangelista from Santo Tomas
Andro Quinday from Letran
Emmanuel Malasig from Berkeley (US)
Jobe Nkemakolam from Ateneo
Jonathan Uyloan – signed by Rain or Shine Elasto Painters as a free agent
Jonathan Parreno from WMSU

Note
*All aspirants are Filipinos until proven otherwise.

References

External links
 PBA.ph

Philippine Basketball Association draft
draft